Sultan Kudarat, officially the Province of Sultan Kudarat (Maguindanaon: Dairat nu Sultan Kudarat, Jawi: دايرت نو سلطان كودرت;), is a province in the Philippines located in the Soccsksargen region in Mindanao. Its capital is Isulan and the commercial center is Tacurong.

On February 23, 1995, Sultan Kudarat transferred from Autonomous Region in Muslim Mindanao (now Bangsamoro Autonomous Region) to Soccsksargen.

Etymology 
The name Sultan Kudarat given to the province was derived from the Maguindanaon Muslim ruler, Sultan Muhammad Dipatuan Kudarat who begun to assert his leadership in the year 1619 and reigned in the Sultanate of Maguindanao from 1625 to 1671. Through his leadership, Spanish forces were successfully repelled from encroaching the Cotabato region of south-central Mindanao. He is considered a national hero, and in his honor the province was named after him.

History

Sultan Kudarat was once part of the Sultanate of Maguindanao. It became one of the stronghold of the Maguindanao society as some royal families have established their own Sultanate in the region.

Sultan Kudarat was part of the former province of Cotabato, until its creation as an independent province (along with Maguindanao and North Cotabato) on November 22, 1973, through Presidential Decree No. 341.

Palimbang massacre 

One notable event that took place in Sultan Kudarat was the Palimbang Massacre (also called the  Malisbong Masjid Massacre), which saw the mass murder of Moro residents of Barrio Malisbong in Palimbang by units of the Philippine Military on September 24, 1974,–1,500 two years after Ferdinand Marcos declared martial law. Accounts compiled by the Moro Women's Center in General Santos state that 1,500 male Moros aged 11–70 were killed inside a mosque, 3,000 women and children aged 9–60 were detained – with the women being raped – and that 300 houses were razed by the government forces.

Geography
Sultan Kudarat is situated on the southwestern section of central Mindanao. It is bounded on the north by the provinces of Maguindanao and Cotabato; on the south by South Cotabato and Sarangani; on the east by Davao del Sur; and on the west by the Moro Gulf and the Celebes Sea.

Two major mountain ranges encompass the province; the Alip Mountain Range in Columbio and the Daguma Mountain Range within the towns of Bagumbayan, Isulan and Esperanza. The three coastal towns on the province's western side (Lebak, Kalamansig and Palimbang) are lined with mountain ranges that separate the central part of the province from the sea. There are also mountains on the eastern side, leaving flat land in between.

These coastal areas are prone to tsunamis coming from the Celebes Sea. Approximately 2/3 of Lake Buluan's area is covered by the province in the towns of Lutayan and President Quirino. There are 7 major rivers within the province: Alip, Allah, Kapingkong, Tran, Salaman, Palimbang and Kabulnan. Additionally, there are 23 large creeks and 11 major springs within the province.

Land use and soil types
Forestland constitutes majority of the province land use (50.32% ), followed by agricultural land (44.77%), fishing grounds (2.42%), non-agricultural land (1.16%), "other bodies of water" (1.02%), and fishponds (0.31%).

Five major soil types are found within the province, majority of which is classified as Mountain Soil (71%), followed by Sandy Loam (12.036%), Silty Clay Loam (4.880%), Clay Loam (4.612%) and Loamy Sand (0.185).

Climate
The climate of Sultan Kudarat falls under Type IV of Climate (characterized by rain showers or evenly distributed rainfall throughout the year). Heavy rainfall occurs from April to November. Unlike most other provinces in the country, Sultan Kudarat is generally free from typhoons as it is situated outside the "typhoon belt".

Administrative divisions
Sultan Kudarat comprises 11 municipalities and 1 city. Three of the municipalities (Kalamansig, Lebak, and Palimbang) are coastal towns, while the rest of the province is located inland. The 11 municipalities and Tacurong City are further subdivided into 249 barangays.

Tacurong City is the smallest unit in the province by land area, but is the most urbanized and is considered the province's commercial center. Other growth centers are Lebak and Isulan, the latter being the provincial capital.

Demographics

At the 2000 census, the province had a total population of 586,505 inhabitants, which grew to 747,087 in the 2010 census. About 113 ethnic groups were identified in the province in the 2000 Census. The Hiligaynons constitute the majority of the population, with Hiligaynon being the province's most widely spoken language. Other languages spoken in the province are Maguindanaon, Karay-a, Dulangan Manobo, Blaan, Teduray, Ilocano, and Cebuano. Tagalog and English are also widely understood and used in education, business, and administration as the national official languages.

Aside from the Hiligaynons, who settled in Sultan Kudarat around the 17th to 18th centuries along with the Karay-as, whereas their fellow new settlers from Visayas continued until the Philippine independence, other ethnic groups in the province include the Maguindanaons (who constitute the majority of the provincial Muslim population), as well as the Manobos, Tedurays and Blaans, the three autochthonous ethnic groups of the province. Ilocanos and Cebuanos meanwhile are relative newcomers to the province, with the former comprising the majority of the population in the towns of Lambayong and President Quirino, and the latter in the town of Kalamansig.

Religion

The four major religious groups in Sultan Kudarat are Roman Catholicism (55.99%), Islam (22.88%), Evangelical (7.20%), and Iglesia ni Cristo (2.26%). Other Christian groups constitute most of the remainders such as the Seventh-day Adventists, United Church of Christ in the Philippines, Jehovah's Witnesses, United Methodist Church, Southern Baptists, as well as "tribal religions".
In 2015 the Philippine Statistics Authority recorded Islam followed by 29.48% of the population.

Economy

The economy of Sultan Kudarat is predominantly agricultural. The leading crops produced in the province are rice, corn, coconuts, coffee, bananas, mangoes, durians and African palm. The province is self-sufficient in poultry, swine and root crops, and is one of the few producers of Irish potatoes in the Philippines. The southern Philippines Grain Complex in Tacurong is the largest grains-processing complex in the country. There are more than 200 rice mills in the province.

Fishing is an industry in the three coastal towns of the province (Kalamansig, Lebak and Palimbang). Tuna caught along the coasts along the Celebes Sea are exported to Japan and Europe.

Other economic activities include cottage industries, which include crafts made of rattan and other types of wood.

Metallic minerals, which include copper, gold and silver, are found within the mountainous areas of Isulan, Bagumbayan, Sen. Ninoy Aquino, Palimbang and Columbio. Non-metallic minerals which include sand, gravel and marbleized limestone are also found in the province.

Education
For the school year 2009–2010, the province has 475 schools (401 public and 74 private), 368 of which were elementary schools, 90 were secondary, and 17 were tertiary. Sultan Kudarat State University is the only public tertiary school within the province, 
with its main campus at Tacurong City. Its other campuses are situated in Bagumbayan, Isulan, Kalamansig, Lutayan, Palimbang, and Senator Ninoy Aquino.

Health facilities
In 2010, Sultan Kudarat had 27 hospitals (5 government-owned, 22 private and 1 mobile hospital), which are classified into 17 primary
(6-25 beds capacity), 8 secondary (25-100 beds capacity) and 2 tertiary (over 100 beds capacity). Tacurong had the most number of hospitals in the province with 11, followed by Isulan with 5.

Transportation

Sultan Kudarat has two seaports: the Port of Lebak in Kalamansig and the San Roque Port in Palimbang, and four airports (2 government-owned: Lebak Municipal Airport and President Quirino Airport, and 2 privately owned: Kalamansig Airport and Kenram Airport).

Government

Elected Officials
The following are the elected government officials and their years of tenure:

Elected Officials :
 Governor: Pax S. Mangudadatu
 Vice Governor: Raden C. Sakaluran
 1st District w/ Tacurong City: Suharto T. Mangudadatu
 2nd District: Horacio Suansing

Elected Officials :
 Governor: Suharto T. Mangudadatu
 Vice Governor: Ernesto F. Matias
 1st District w/ Tacurong City: Rep. Raden C. Sakaluran
 2nd District: Rep. Arnulfo F. Go

Elected Officials :
 Governor:  Suharto T. Mangudadatu
 Vice Governor: Donato A. Ligo
 1st District w/ Tacurong City: Rep. Pax S. Mangudadatu
 2nd District: Rep. Arnulfo F. Go

Elected Officials :
 Representative: Suharto T. Mangudadatu
 Governor: Pax S. Mangudadatu
 Vice Governor: Donato A. Ligo

Elected Officials :
 Representative: Angelo O. Montilla
 Governor: Pax S. Mangudadatu
 Vice Governor: Miguel Domingo T. Jacalan III

Elected Officials :
 Representative: Angelo O. Montilla
 Governor: Nesthur R. Gumana
 Vice Governor: Rose P. Jamison

Elected Officials :
 Representative: Estanislao Váldez
 Governor: Nesthur R. Gumana
 Vice Governor: Sinsuat A. Andang, Sr.

List of former governors
The former governors who have administered the province are:

 Carlos B. Cajelo  
 Gonzalo H. Siongco  
 Conrado E. Buencamino  
 Benjamin C. Duque  ; was elected Governor 
 Aurelio C. Freires, Jr. 
 Perfecto C. Bautista  
 Fidel A. Fortez  
 Exequiel S. Mayordomo  
 Nesthur R. Gumana  
 Rosila P. Jamison 
 Pax S. Mangudadatu 
 Suharto T. Mangudadatu 
 Pax S. Mangudadatu 
 Suharto T. Mangudadatu

Festivals

Festivals celebrated within the province include:

 Kalimudan — celebrated in the province of Sultan Kudarat, a gathering of ethnic groups within the province
 Bansadayaw — celebrated in Bagumbayan
 Kastifun — celebrated in Columbio
 Hinabyog — celebrated in Esperanza
 Hamungaya — celebrated in Isulan
 Salagaan — celebrated in Kalamansig
 Timpuyog — celebrated in Lambayong
 Kapeonan — celebrated in Lebak
 Kanduli — celebrated in Lutayan
 Kalilang — celebrated in Palimbang
 Sambuyawan — celebrated in President Quirino
 Sulok — celebrated in Senator Ninoy Aquino
 Talakudong — celebrated in Tacurong City

Citations

References

External links

 
 
 Official website of the provincial government of Sultan Kudarat
 Local Governance Performance Management System
 Manila Statues: Sultan Kudarat Monument Information

 
Provinces of the Philippines
Provinces of Soccsksargen
States and territories established in 1973
1973 establishments in the Philippines
Establishments by Philippine presidential decree